Raimundo Nonato de Lima Ribeiro (born July 5, 1979, in Viseu, Pará), known as just Nonato, is a Brazilian former footballer who last played as a forward for Goianésia. His previous clubs include Fortaleza, Goiás, FC Seoul, Daegu FC, Ituano, Iraty, Tuna Luso, Bahia and Trindade. One of his best passages was with Rio Verde, Goias traditional team.
He became top scorer during several rounds, even with the team in the relegation zone. He lost his artillery to Patrique, of Vila Nova, but saved the "Verdão do Sudoeste" (Southwest Green) from "sticking". It is often known as the top scorer Nonato. He had disagreements with the board's "Verdão" and ended up leaving before the last round of Campeonato Goiano de 2012. Currently, he dispute the Campeonato Goiano de 2013 for Goianésia.

Honours
 Campeonato do Nordeste in 2001, 2002 with Esporte Clube Bahia
 Campeonato Baiano in 1999, 2001 with Esporte Clube Bahia
 Campeonato Goiano in 2006 with Goiás

External links
 
 
 

1979 births
Living people
Association football forwards
Brazilian footballers
Brazilian expatriate footballers
Tuna Luso Brasileira players
Iraty Sport Club players
Ituano FC players
Esporte Clube Bahia players
Daegu FC players
FC Seoul players
Goiás Esporte Clube players
Fortaleza Esporte Clube players
Hokkaido Consadole Sapporo players
Treze Futebol Clube players
Atlético Clube Goianiense players
ABC Futebol Clube players
K League 1 players
J1 League players
Expatriate footballers in South Korea
Expatriate footballers in Japan
Sportspeople from Pará
Brazilian expatriate sportspeople in South Korea
Brazilian expatriate sportspeople in Japan